Jian'an, Chien-an, or Chienan may refer to:

Jian'an (Eastern Han) (196–220), an era name used by Emperor Xian of Han
Jian'an District, a district of Xuchang, Henan
Jian'an Subdistrict, a subdistrict in Qiaodong District, Shijiazhuang, Hebei
Jian'an poetry, a Chinese poetry style associated with the late Han Dynasty
Seven Scholars of Jian'an, a group of scholars from the above period

See also
 Jianan (disambiguation), or Chianan